Kovar is a nickel–cobalt ferrous alloy.

Kovar may also refer to:
Kovar (surname), surname
Kovář, Czech surname
Kővár, Hungarian name for the Romanian village of Remetea Chioarului
Kövər, village and municipality in Azerbaijan
Kovar, Texas, USA

See also 
Kabar or Khavar, a Khazar tribe that reached Carpathia
Khowar language, a Dardic language of Pakistan